Maxim Andreyevich Kurdyukov (born 28 September 1990) is a Russian pair skater. With former partner Ekaterina Petaikina, he placed 6th at the 2012 Junior Worlds and is the 2012 Russian Junior silver medalist.

Career

In Russia 
Early in his pairs career, Kurdyukov competed with Alexandra Malakhova. By the 2008–09 season, he was skating with Ekaterina Petaikina. They made their ISU Junior Grand Prix debut in 2009. In the 2011–12 JGP season, the pair finished fourth in Latvia and won bronze in Austria. Their results qualified them for the 2011–12 Junior Grand Prix Final, where they placed fourth. Petaikina/Kurdyukov took the silver medal at the 2012 Russian Junior Championships and were sent to the 2012 World Junior Championships where they finished sixth. They parted ways in May 2012. 

Later in 2012, Kurdyukov teamed up with Kristina Astakhova. Their partnership lasted two seasons.

In the United States 
In 2015, he teamed up with U.S. skater Brianna de la Mora, with whom he trains at Texas Gulf Coast FSC in Sugar Land, Texas. They finished 8th at the 2016 U.S. Championships.

Programs

With Astakhova

With Petaikina

Competitive highlights

With de la Mora

With Astakhova

With Petaikina

With Malakhova

References

External links 

 
 

Russian male pair skaters
1990 births
Living people
Sportspeople from Oskemen